United Nations Security Council resolution 595, adopted unanimously on 27 March 1987, after noting the death of International Court of Justice (ICJ) judge and Vice President Guy Ladreit de Laucharrière on 10 March, the council decided that elections to the vacancy on the ICJ would take place on 14 September 1987 at the Security Council and at the General Assembly's 41st session.

Laucharrière was a French diplomat who had represented the country in the United Nations. In 1982, he was elected to the ICJ, and was elected its vice president in 1985. His term of office was due to expire in February 1988.

See also
 Judges of the International Court of Justice
 List of United Nations Security Council Resolutions 501 to 600 (1982–1987)

References

External links
 
Text of the Resolution at undocs.org

 0595
 0595
March 1987 events